The  (OSE) was an international organisation based at Benares (Varanasi), India, from . It was established by the leadership of the Theosophical Society at Adyar, Madras (Chennai), in order to prepare the world for the arrival of a reputed messianic entity, the World Teacher or Maitreya. The OSE acquired members worldwide as it expanded in many countries; a third of its diverse membership  was unaffiliated with the Theosophical Society. The precursor organisation was formed after leading Theosophists discovered a likely candidate for the new messiah in the thenadolescent Jiddu Krishnamurti (18951986), a South Indian Brahmin who was installed as Head of the Order. Almost two decades later Krishnamurti rejected the messianic role, repudiated the Order's mission, and in 1929 disbanded the OSE's successor. The founding and activities of these organisations, as well as the largely unexpected dissolution of the OSE's successor, attracted widespread media attention and public interest. They also led to crises in the Theosophical Society and to schisms in Theosophy.

Background

One of the central tenets of late 19th-century Theosophy as promoted by the Theosophical Society was the complex doctrine of intelligent evolution of all existence. This was said to be occurring on a Cosmic scale, incorporating both physical and non-physical aspects of the known and unknown Universe, and affecting all of its constituent parts regardless of apparent size or importance. The theory was originally promulgated in the Secret Doctrine (published 1888), a book by Helena Blavatsky, one of the founders of contemporary Theosophy and the Theosophical 

According to this view, Humankind's evolution on Earth (and beyond) is part of the Cosmic evolution. It is reputedly overseen by a hidden hierarchy, the Masters of the Ancient Wisdom, whose upper echelons consist of advanced spiritual beings. Blavatsky portrayed the Theosophical Society as one of the hierarchy's many attempts (or "impulses") throughout the millennia, to guide Humanity in concert with the intelligent evolutionary scheme to its ultimate, immutable objective: the attainment of perfection and the conscious participation in the evolutionary process. Blavatsky stated that these attempts may require an Earth-based infrastructure (such as the Theosophical Society), to pave the way for the hierarchy's physically appearing emissaries, "the torch-bearer of Truth". The mission of these reputedly regularly appearing emissaries is to practically translate, in a way and language understood by contemporary humanity, the knowledge required to propel it to a higher evolutionary

History

Early history
Blavatsky also wrote about the possible impact of Theosophy and the Theosophical Society in her book The Key to Theosophy (published 1889):

Based on this and other Blavatsky writings, Theosophists expected the future advent of the aforementioned "next impulse"; additional information was the purview of the Society's Esoteric Section, which Blavatsky had founded and originally 

After Blavatsky's death in 1891, influential Theosophist Charles Webster Leadbeater expanded on her writings about the spiritual hierarchy and the Masters. He formulated a Christology in which he identified Christ with the Theosophical representation of the Buddhist concept of Maitreya. Leadbeater believed that Maitreya-as-Christ had manifested on Earth in several occasions, using in each case a specially prepared person as a "vehicle". The incarnated Maitreya assumed the role of World Teacher of Humankind, dispensing knowledge regarding underlying truths of 

Annie Besant, another well-known and influential Theosophist (and eventual close associate of Leadbeater's), had also developed an interest on the advent of the next emissary from the spiritual hierarchy. During the decades of the 1890s and 1900s, along with Leadbeater and others, she became progressively convinced that this advent would happen sooner than Blavatsky's proposed timetable. They came to believe it would involve the imminent reappearance of Maitreya as World Teacher, a monumental event in the Theosophical worldview. However, not all Theosophical Society members accepted Leadbeater's and Besant's ideas on the matter; the dissidents charged them with straying from Theosophical orthodoxy and, along with other concepts developed by the two, their elaborations on the Theosophical Maitreya were derisively labelled Neo-Theosophy by their 

Besant became President of the Theosophical Society in 1907, and added considerable weight to the belief of Maitreya's imminent manifestation; this eventually became a commonly held expectation among Theosophists. Besant had started commenting on the possibly imminent arrival of the next emissary as early as 1896; by 1909 the proclaimed "coming Teacher" was a main topic of her lectures and

"Discovery" of Jiddu Krishnamurti
At the time Jiddu Narayaniah, Krishnamurti's father and longtime Theosophist, was employed by the Society; the family, in relatively poor condition, lived next to the compound. Leadbeater was a controversial figure whose knowledge on occult matters was highly respected by the Society's leadership. He came to believe young Krishnamurti was a suitable candidate for the vehicle of the World Teacher despite the boy's reputedly dull personality and lackluster intellect. Leadbeater soon placed Krishnamurti, and at the latter's insistence his inseparable younger brother Jiddu Nityananda ("Nitya"), under his and the Society's wing; in  Besant, as President of the Society and head of its Esoteric Section, admitted the Jiddu brothers into both. In  she became their 

Following the "discovery", Leadbeater began occult examinations of Krishnamurti, to whom he had assigned the pseudonym  the name of a star in the Pleiades star cluster, and of characters from Greek mythology. Leadbeater's belief regarding the boy's suitability was strengthened by his clairvoyance-aided investigations of Krishnamurti's reputed past and future lives. Results of these investigations were recorded, and eventually published in Theosophical magazines starting  and in a book in 1913. They were widely read and discussed within the Society, as according to Leadbeater, contemporary Theosophists were involved in various "lives of Alcyone". Such reputed involvement became a matter of status and prestige among Theosophists; it also contributed to factionalism within the Society. In the meantime, Krishnamurti was put on a comprehensive multiyear regimen of physical, intellectual, social, and spiritual training in preparation for his probable future

Order of the Rising Sun

In  the Theosophical Society published the first work "by Alcyone", a booklet entitled At the Feet of the Master. Arundale, Principal of the Central Hindu College (CHC), had been impressed by Alcyone's writings, and formed the Order around a CHC-based study group of disciples headed by Krishnamurti. The new entity was generally focused on the expected World Teacher, yet the recently discovered Krishnamurti-Alcyone was somewhat obliquely at the center of its 

Meanwhile, the activities and proclamations of Leadbeater, Besant, and other senior Theosophists regarding Krishnamurti and the expected Teacher became entangled in prior disputes within and without the Theosophical Society, and also the subjects of new controversies. The evolving controversies, as well as objections by Hindu members of the CHC faculty, prompted Besant to officially disband the organisation in  however, a replacement had already been

Order of the Star in the East
It was named after the Star of Bethlehem, signifying the proclaimed approach of the new manifestation of Christ-Maitreya. The top positions of the organisation were filled: "Mrs Besant and Leadbeater were made Protectors of the new Order of which Krishna  was the Head, Arundale Private Secretary to the Head, and Wodehouse Organizing Secretary". News regarding Krishnamurti, the Order, and its mission received widespread publicity and worldwide press coverage; the publicity may have been at least partly driven by aspects of the era's prevailing

Objective and principles

The goal of the OSE was to educate and prepare the world for the arrival of the World Teacher and to remove any material obstacles and difficulties from his path. By  the Order had  members worldwide; most of them were also members of the Theosophical Society. However, membership was open to anyone, the only precondition being acceptance of the "Declaration of Principles", which stated the following:

The organisation had no other rules, and there were no membership fees or subscriptions. New members received an OSE certificate , and could thereafter display the organisation's emblem, a silver

Activities

Following its establishment the OSE began its mission in earnest. Lecture tours, meetings and other activities were undertaken by prominent members of the Order. Articles and pamphlets about the OSE and its mission, published regularly by Theosophical organisations, were joined by an official bulletin, The Herald of the Star, originally based at Adyar, which started publication in 

As Krishnamurti came of age, he embarked on an intensified schedule of lectures and discussions in several countries, and acquired a large following among the membership of the Theosophical Society. National Sections of the Order were eventually formed in as many as forty countries.

On  during a ceremony officiated by Krishnamurti at the close of the annual Theosophical Convention (held that year at Benares), those present were reported to be suddenly overwhelmed by a strange feeling of "tremendous power", which seemed to be flowing through Krishnamurti. In Leadbeater's description, "it reminded one irresistibly of the rushing, mighty wind, and the outpouring of the Holy Ghost at Pentecost. The tension was enormous, and every one in the room was most powerfully affected." The next day, at a meeting of the Esoteric Section, Besant for the first time announced that it was now clear Krishnamurti was indeed the required vehicle. Thereafter, 28 December became a "sacred day" for the 

In 1912, Krishnamurti's father sued Besant in order to annul her guardianship of his sons, which he had previously granted. Among the reasons stated in Narayaniah's deposition was his objection to the deification of Krishnamurti, said to have been caused by Besant's "announcement that he was to be the Lord Christ, with the result that a number of respectable persons had prostrated before him." Besant eventually won the case on 

Also in 1912, most members of the Theosophical Society's German Section followed its head, Rudolf Steiner, in splitting from the parent Society partly due to disagreement over Besant's and Leadbeater's proclamations concerning Krishnamurti's messianic 

Controversy regarding the OSE and Krishnamurti again engulfed the Central Hindu College. In 1913, a number of the Order's supporters resigned their positions at the CHC following opposition by the school's administration and trustees, who considered the Order's activities 

In 1920, Nitya replaced Wodehouse as OSE Organising Secretary. The next year, the first international Congress of the Order of the Star in the East was held in Paris, France, attended by  out of then  worldwide. At the Congress it was decided that there would be no special ceremonies or rituals associated with the Order or with the World Teacher. Also in the 1920s, regularly scheduled multiday Star Camps, supported by well-organised facilities, started to be held in the Netherlands, the United States, and India. They were attended by thousands of members, with coverage provided by local and international 

In 1922, during a stay in Ojai, California, Krishnamurti had a series of physical, psychological and spiritual experiences over a period of several months, that affected him deeply. Rumours of strange happenings started circulating among OSE members, yet the events of Ojai (and similar later Krishnamurti experiences) remained unknown outside of the Theosophical leadership and Krishnamurti's inner 

In  close Krishnamurti associate and friend  was appointed General Secretary following Nitya's unexpected death. While the Order's activities continued without visible disruption, Nitya's death was a privately devastating, watershed event for 

Financing the venture and subsequent expansion did not appear to present a problem. Properties in several countries were acquired via specially-formed trusts or by affiliates, for a variety of purposes. Donations were regularly solicited, along with project-based funding appeals to the members, some of whom were considerably wealthy. In collaboration with the Theosophical Society, the OSE had been producing a number of publications and propaganda material ; in 1926, it organised its own publishing arm: the Star Publishing Trust, based at Eerde, Ommen, the Netherlands. Along with an official international bulletin published in Ommen (the International Star Bulletin), national bulletins eventually appeared in twenty-one countries, and in fourteen different languages. Also in 1926 it was reported that the Order's membership had reached   of which were members of the Theosophical

Claims and expectations
By  efforts of prominent Theosophists and their affiliated factions to favourably position themselves for the expected  were reaching a climax. Extraordinary pronouncements of accelerated spiritual advancement were being made by various parties, privately disputed by others. Ranking members of the Order and the Society had publicly declared themselves to have been chosen as apostles of the new Messiah. The escalating claims of spiritual success, and the internal (and hidden from the public) Theosophical politics, alienated an increasingly disillusioned Krishnamurti. His commitment and enthusiasm had been uneven since the Order's early days, and in private he had occasionally expressed doubts about his presumed mission. He refused to recognise anyone as his disciple or apostle. In the meantime, World Teacher-related spinoff projects proliferated: in  the establishment of a "World Religion" and a "World University" were announced by the Theosophical leadership. Both of them were later "quietly 

The annual Star Congress for 1925 opened at Adyar on the "sacred day" of  following the much anticipated but uneventful Theosophical Convention. At the opening, an event occurred that was reminiscent of the incident that had happened on the same day of 1911. Krishnamurti had been giving a speech about the World Teacher and the significance of his coming, when "a dramatic change" took place: his voice suddenly altered and he switched to first person, saying "I come for those who want sympathy, who want happiness, who are longing to be released, who are longing to find happiness in all things. I come to reform and not to tear down, I come not to destroy but to build." For many of the assembled who noticed, it was a "spine-tingling" revelation,  instantly and independently" confirmation, in their view, that the manifestation of the Lord Maitreya through his chosen vehicle had

Order of the Star

The reputed manifestation of the World Teacher prompted a number of celebratory statements and assertions by prominent Theosophists that were not unanimously accepted by Society members. One result was the persistence of controversy regarding the project. Besant and other leaders of the Society largely managed to contain the dissenters and the controversy, but in the process sustained unflattering publicity. However the endeavour, often referred to as "the World Teacher Project", was also receiving serious and neutral coverage in the global media, and according to reports it was followed sympathetically and with interest by 

In related developments following the perceived manifestation, Besant announced in   World Teacher is here", and many Star members expected Krishnamurti's unequivocal public proclamation of his messianic status. Land was purchased in Ojai for a "colony project", to serve as a "miniature model of a new civilisation" mentored by the World Teacher.

The renamed organisation had two objectives:

Complementing the reorganisation and the proclamations of the World Teacher's manifestation, in 1928 the "World Mother Project", headed by Rukmini Devi Arundale (George Arundale's young wife), was put in motion by Theosophical leaders. Krishnamurti again distanced himself from this endeavour, which Indian and international press reports dubbed "Mrs. Besant's New Fad", and it was to be

Dissolution and repudiation
By the  Krishnamurti's emphasis in public talks and private discussions had changed. He had been gradually discarding or contradicting Theosophical concepts and terminology, disagreeing with leading Theosophists, and talking less about the World Teacher; public interest, and attendance at his speaking engagements, remained high. The shift in emphasis mirrored fundamental changes in Krishnamurti as a person, including his increasing disenchantment with the World Teacher Project. Instrumental in these changes, according to his biographers, were among other reasons the reputed experiences that had first occurred at Ojai, and Nitya's unexpected death . Consequently, Krishnamurti stated that he undertook a thorough re-evaluation of his relationship with the Project, the Theosophical Society, and Theosophy in 

In his speech dissolving the organisation (also broadcast on Dutch radio), Krishnamurti said:

Despite the changes in Krishnamurti's outlook and pronouncements during the preceding years (and more recent rumours of impending dissolution), the ending of the Order and its mission shocked many of its supporters. Prominent Theosophists openly or under various guises turned against Krishnamurti including Leadbeater, who reputedly stated, "the Coming has gone wrong". However, other Society members supported Krishnamurti's new direction, and opposed the critical views expressed by Theosophical 

Soon after the dissolution Krishnamurti severed his ties to Theosophy and the Theosophical Society. He denounced the concepts of saviors, spiritual teachers, leaders and followers. Vowing to work towards setting humankind "absolutely, unconditionally free", he repudiated all doctrines and theories of inner, spiritual and psychological evolution such as those implied in the Theosophical tenets described above . Instead, he posited that his goal of complete psychological freedom could be realised only through the understanding of individuals' actual relationships with themselves, society, and 

Krishnamurti returned to the donors estates, property and funds that had been given to the Order in its various incarnations. He spent the rest of his life promoting his post-Theosophical message around the world as an independent speaker and writer. He became widely known as an original, influential thinker on philosophical, psychological, and religious

Consequences
In 1907, the first year for which reliable records were kept, the worldwide membership of the Theosophical Society was estimated at  During the following two decades membership suffered due to splits and resignations, but by the mid1920s it was rising again; it eventually peaked in 1928 at  The membership of the Order in its various guises kept increasing steadily, yet Krishnamurti's changing message in the period leading to the dissolution may have negatively affected growth. Many members of the Order were also members of the Theosophical Society; consequently, as many as a third of the members of the Society left "within a few years" of Krishnamurti's disbanding of the Order. In the opinion of a Krishnamurti biographer, the Society, already in decline for other reasons, "was in disarray" upon the dissolution of the Order.

The failed project led to considerable analysis and retrospective evaluations by the Society and by well-known Theosophists, at that time and since. It also resulted in governance changes in the Theosophical Society Adyar, a reorientation of its Esoteric Section, re-examination of parts of its doctrine, and reticence to outside questions regarding the OSE and the World Teacher Project. According to both theosophical and non-theosophical observers, Theosophical organisations, especially the Theosophical Society Adyar, by the close of the  had yet to recover from Krishnamurti's rejection and the entire World Teacher affair, and entered the 21st still dealing with their

Cultural references
Events and personalities related to the World Teacher Project and the OSE have been portrayed, or alluded to, in artistic and cultural works.

"The Word of the Master", is a 1925 work for voice and piano by Finnish composer Leevi Madetoja  Originally published as "At the Feet of the Master (Alcyone)", its devotional lyrics are based on the eponymous book .

"Benares, 1910", an episode in the 1990s US television series The Young Indiana Jones Chronicles created by George Lucas, is taking place in Benares around the time of Krishnamurti's discovery and the formation of the OSE. The hour-long episode loosely (and sympathetically) portrays these and related events. The including series explores the childhood and youth of the fictional character Indiana Jones; in this instalment, the protagonist gets to meet the boy Krishnamurti, Besant and Leadbeater. Filmed on location at Benares. The episode originally aired on  during primetime, on the ABC television network; it achieved modest Nielsen ratings. It was later re-packaged in a television film titled The Journey of Radiance(2000), which was also released, along with related documentary material, on 

Blue Dove, a musical in two acts, is based on Krishnamurti's life between his discovery by Leadbeater and the start of his career as an independent philosopher and speaker following the dissolution of the Order of the Star. The libretto and plot, by Englishman Peter Wells, employ considerable artistic licence in their portrayals of related persons and

Notes

References

 

 

 

 

 

 

 

 

 

  .

 

 

 

 

 

 .

 

 

 

 

 

 

 

 

 

 

 

 .

 

 

 

 

 

 

 

 

 

 

  .

 

  .

 

 

 

 

 

 

 

 

 

 .

External links

 "Audio | J. Krishnamurti - Brockwood Park 1970 - Interview by  Thomas" In the first seven-and-a-half minutes of this interview, published in a 29-minute YouTube video by the J. Krishnamurti Official Channel, broadcaster/radio host Wilfrid Thomas asks Krishnamurti about the World Teacher Project, his erstwhile Theosophical sponsors and the Theosophical Society. Brockwood Park in Hampshire, UK, is the site of a Krishnamurti-affiliated school.

Katinka Hesselink.

 "Krishnamurti" Information and commentary about the World Teacher Project and the relationship between Krishnamurti and the Theosophical Society. Govert W. Schüller.

1911 establishments in India
1927 disestablishments in India
Jiddu Krishnamurti
Messianism
Organizations established in 1911
Theosophical Society
Theosophy